Íðunn Magnussen (born 15 August 1993) is a Faroese football midfielder who currently plays for EB/Streymur/Skála.

Honours 
EB/Streymur/Skála
Runners-up
 1. deild kvinnur (2): 2013, 2014

International goals
Scores and results list Faroe Islands' goal tally first.

References

External links 
 
 Íðunn Magnussen profile at FaroeSoccer

1993 births
Living people
Faroese women's footballers
Faroe Islands women's youth international footballers
Faroe Islands women's international footballers
Women's association football midfielders